La morte risale a ieri sera (translation: Death occurred last night) is a 1970 crime film directed by Duccio Tessari. The film was written by Tessari and Biagio Proietti and based on the novel I milanesi ammazzano al sabato (translation: The Milanese Kill on Saturdays) by Giorgio Scerbanenco.

La morte risale a ieri sera stars Raf Vallone and Frank Wolff. The film's score was composed by Gianni Ferrio, whose baroque and psychedelic contributions to the soundtrack were described by one critic as inconsistent with the tone of the film.
The film was distributed internationally under the title Death Occurred Last Night in 1970, which only had a 95-minute running time.

Plot
Following the disappearance of his beautiful but mentally disabled daughter, Avanzio Berzaghi (Raf Vallone) travels to Milan to track her down. Local detective Duca Lamberti (Frank Wolff) investigates the city's pimps and prostitutes for clues, eventually finding the girl's burnt body in a field. The pimps disposed of the young girl when they heard investigators were looking for her. Berzaghi vows to find the girl's murderer, eventually tracking down his quarry from a clue related to the girl's teddy bear. Berzaghi exacts his revenge but finds no satisfaction from having done so.

Cast
 Frank Wolff as detective Duca Lamberti
 Raf Vallone as  Amanzio Berzaghi
 Gabriele Tinti as  Mascaranti
 Gillian Bray as Donatella Berzaghi
 Eva Renzi as the wife of Lamberti
 Gigi Rizzi as  Salvatore
 Beryl Cunningham as Herrero

Production
La morte risale a ieri sera was written by Biagio Proietti and director Duccio Tessari. the film is based on Giorgio Scerbanenco's 1969 novel I milanesi ammazzano al sabato (translation: The Milanese Kill on Saturdays). The book was published just a few months before the author's death. Several of Scerbanenco's works featuring the detective character Duca Lamberti were adapted to film around this time, including Milano calibro 9 in 1972 and Il caso Venere privata in 1970.

The film's soundtrack was composed by Gianni Ferrio, who had previously worked with Tessari on the 1969 Spaghetti Western Vivi o, preferibilmente, morti, and would do so again on his 1971 giallo Una farfalla con le ali insanguinate. Ferrio's score spans several musical styles, incorporating psychedelic rock, baroque pop and jazz.

Release
La morte risale a ieri sera was distributed by Titanus in Italy on September 5, 1970. The film grossed a total of 568,294,000 Italian lire domestically. The film was later released in West Germany as Gemordet wird nur Samtags on July 16, 1971. The film has been distributed internationally under the titles Death Occurred Last Night,  as well as Death Took Place Last Night and Horror Came out of the Fog.

Reception
From retrospective reviews, Robert Firsching wrote in AllMovie that La morte risale a ieri seras plot featured "a great deal more humanity than is typical for the [crime] genre", finding that Tessari's focus on characterisation over plot was its key strength. Firsching commented on the film's score negatively, stating that Ferrio's score and its "bouncy" tone was inconsistent with the film. The film, and the character of Lamberti, have been seen as precursors to the postmodernist works of American director Quentin Tarantino.

Footnotes

References

External links

 

1970 films
1970 crime films
Films based on works by Giorgio Scerbanenco
Films directed by Duccio Tessari
Italian crime films
Films set in Milan
Films scored by Gianni Ferrio
West German films
German crime films
1970s Italian films
1970s German films